Anglesia Visconti (1377–1439), was a queen consort of Cyprus by marriage to King Janus. She was daughter of Bernabò Visconti, Lord of Milan and Beatrice Regina della Scala, daughter of Mastino II lord of Verona.

Anglesia became queen consort of Cyprus, through marriage to King Janus of Cyprus, sometime after January 1400. Janus was also a titular king of Jerusalem and Armenia. The marriage was annulled between 1407 and 1409 without issue.

Her sister Valentina Visconti married to Peter II of Cyprus, a cousin of Janus.

References

Cypriot queens consort
1377 births
1439 deaths
15th century in Cyprus
15th-century Italian women
People from Nicosia
Anglesia
14th-century Italian nobility
14th-century Italian women
15th-century Italian nobility